Sankt Ignatios College is an inter-Orthodox Christian educational institution in Sweden. The college provides education and training for those called to service in the Orthodox Churches. The college is based in Södertälje and in Bromma, Stockholm.

History 
The college came into being in 2018 through a collaboration between Sankt Ignatios Folkhögskola and Stockholm School of Theology, (University College Stockholm).  Students who are preparing for ministry in the churches receive courses and instruction at both the Folkhögskola and university levels.

The education at Folkhögskola level involves foundational theological, biblical and vocational courses, especially those focused on the Orthodox Church traditions. At the Department of Eastern Christian Studies at Stockholm School of theology, students undertake undergraduate and postgraduate programs leading to BTh and MTh degrees. The college also organises and supervises two master's programs in “International Relations and Ecumenism” and “Religion, Politics and Democracy” and also a doctoral research program. The (full) professors in the college include Samuel Rubenson, Davor Džalto, and Cyril Hovorun.

The seminaries 
All students in Sankt Ignatios College are enrolled in one of the four seminaries representing the major Orthodox traditions in Sweden. The Byzantine (Greek and Slavic) Orthodox Seminary; The Coptic Orthodox Seminary; The Syrian Orthodox Seminary; The Tewahedo (Eritrean and Ethiopic) Orthodox Seminary. The seminaries serve as a contact between the students and the Church traditions they belong to, as well as providing accommodation for the students during their study time. They are based in Södertälje where the majority of teaching takes place.

See also 
 Sankt Ignatios Foundation

References

External links 
Official Website
Stiftelsen Sankt Ignatios (Swedish site)
Swedish Christian Council

University colleges in Sweden
Higher education in Stockholm
Seminaries and theological colleges in Sweden